Oumar Sène, (born 23 October 1959) is a Senegalese former professional footballer who played as a midfielder.

Career
Sène was born in Dakar, Senegal. He won the Senegal Premier League 1980 with US Gorée. Later he played 197 times for French side Paris Saint-Germain.

Personal life
His son Saër is also a professional footballer.

References

External links
Profile at psg70.free.fr
Profile at tangofoot.free.fr

Living people
1959 births
Footballers from Dakar
Senegalese footballers
Association football midfielders
Senegal international footballers
1986 African Cup of Nations players
1992 African Cup of Nations players
US Gorée players
Stade Lavallois players
Paris Saint-Germain F.C. players
Ligue 1 players
Senegalese expatriate footballers
Senegalese expatriate sportspeople in France
Expatriate footballers in France